Pike Run is a stream in the U.S. state of Ohio.  The stream runs  before it empties into the Ottawa River.

Pike Run was so named on account of its stock of pike fish.

References

Rivers of Allen County, Ohio
Rivers of Ohio